

Events

Pre-1600
585 BC – Lucius Tarquinius Priscus, king of Rome, celebrates a triumph for his victories over the Sabines, and the surrender of Collatia.
509 BC – The Temple of Jupiter Optimus Maximus on Rome's Capitoline Hill is dedicated on the ides of September.
 379 – Yax Nuun Ahiin I is crowned as 15th Ajaw of Tikal 
 533 – Belisarius of the Byzantine Empire defeats Gelimer and the Vandals at the Battle of Ad Decimum, near Carthage, North Africa.
1229 – Ögedei Khan is proclaimed Khagan of the Mongol Empire in Kodoe Aral, Khentii: Mongolia.
1437 – Battle of Tangier: a Portuguese expeditionary force initiates a failed attempt to seize the Moroccan citadel of Tangier.

1601–1900
1609 – Henry Hudson reaches the river that would later be named after him – the Hudson River.
1645 – Wars of the Three Kingdoms: Scottish Royalists are defeated by Covenanters at the Battle of Philiphaugh.
1743 – Great Britain, Austria and the Kingdom of Sardinia sign the Treaty of Worms.
1759 – Battle of the Plains of Abraham: the British defeat the French near Quebec City in the Seven Years' War, known in the United States as the French and Indian War.
1782 – American Revolutionary War: Franco-Spanish troops launch the unsuccessful "grand assault" during the Great Siege of Gibraltar.
1788 – The Philadelphia Convention sets the date for the first presidential election in the United States, and New York City becomes the country's temporary capital.
1791 – King Louis XVI of France accepts the new constitution.
1808 – Finnish War: In the Battle of Jutas, Swedish forces under Lieutenant General Georg Carl von Döbeln beat the Russians, making von Döbeln a Swedish war hero.
1812 – War of 1812: A supply wagon sent to relieve Fort Harrison is ambushed in the Attack at the Narrows.
1814 – In a turning point in the War of 1812, the British fail to capture Baltimore. During the battle, Francis Scott Key composes his poem "Defence of Fort McHenry", which is later set to music and becomes the United States' national anthem.
1843 – The Greek Army rebels (OS date: September 3) against the autocratic rule of king Otto of Greece, demanding the granting of a constitution.
1847 – Mexican–American War: Six teenage military cadets known as Niños Héroes die defending Chapultepec Castle in the Battle of Chapultepec. American troops under General Winfield Scott capture Mexico City in the Mexican–American War.
1848 – Vermont railroad worker Phineas Gage survives an iron rod  in diameter being driven through his brain; the reported effects on his behavior and personality stimulate discussion of the nature of the brain and its functions.
1862 – American Civil War: Union soldiers find a copy of Robert E. Lee's battle plans in a field outside Frederick, Maryland. It is the prelude to the Battle of Antietam.
1880 – The Basuto Gun War breaks out after the Basuto launch a rebellion against the Cape Colony.
1882 – Anglo-Egyptian War: The Battle of Tel el-Kebir is fought.
1898 – Hannibal Goodwin patents celluloid photographic film.
1899 – Henry Bliss is the first person in the United States to be killed in an automobile accident.
  1899   – Mackinder, Ollier and Brocherel make the first ascent of Batian (5,199 m – 17,058 ft), the highest peak of Mount Kenya.
1900 – Filipino insurgents defeat a small American column in the Battle of Pulang Lupa, during the Philippine–American War.

1901–present
1906 – The Santos-Dumont 14-bis makes a short hop, the first flight of a fixed-wing aircraft in Europe.
1914 – World War I: The Battle of Aisne begins between Germany and France.
1922 – The final act of the Greco-Turkish War, the Great Fire of Smyrna, commences.
1923 – Following a military coup in Spain, Miguel Primo de Rivera takes over, setting up a dictatorship.
1933 – Elizabeth McCombs becomes the first woman elected to the New Zealand Parliament.
1942 – World War II: Second day of the Battle of Edson's Ridge in the Guadalcanal Campaign. U.S. Marines successfully defeat attacks by the Japanese with heavy losses for the Japanese forces.
1944 – World War II: Start of the Battle of Meligalas between the Greek Resistance forces of the Greek People's Liberation Army (ELAS) and the collaborationist security battalions.
1948 – Deputy Prime Minister of India Vallabhbhai Patel orders the Army to move into Hyderabad to integrate it with the Indian Union.
  1948   – Margaret Chase Smith is elected United States senator, and becomes the first woman to serve in both the U.S. House of Representatives and the United States Senate.
1953 – Nikita Khrushchev is appointed General Secretary of the Communist Party of the Soviet Union.
1956 – The IBM 305 RAMAC is introduced, the first commercial computer to use disk storage.
1956 – The dike around the Dutch polder East Flevoland is closed.
1962 – An appeals court orders the University of Mississippi to admit James Meredith, the first African-American student admitted to the segregated university.
1964 – South Vietnamese Generals Lâm Văn Phát and Dương Văn Đức fail in a coup attempt against General Nguyễn Khánh.
  1964   – Martin Luther King Jr. addresses a crowd of 20,000 West Berliners on Sunday, in Waldbühne.
1968 – Cold War: Albania leaves the Warsaw Pact.
1971 – State police and National Guardsmen storm New York's Attica Prison to quell a prison revolt, which claimed 43 lives.
  1971   – Chairman Mao Zedong's second in command and successor Marshal Lin Biao flees China after the failure of an alleged coup. His plane crashes in Mongolia, killing all aboard.
1977 – General Motors introduces Diesel engine, with Oldsmobile Diesel engine, in the Delta 88, Oldsmobile 98, and Oldsmobile Custom Cruiser models amongst others.
1979 – South Africa grants independence to the "homeland" of Venda (not recognised outside South Africa).
1982 – Spantax Flight 995 crashes at Málaga Airport during a rejected takeoff, killing 50 of the 394 people on board.
1985 – Super Mario Bros. is released in Japan for the NES, which starts the Super Mario series of platforming games.
1986 – A magnitude 6.0 earthquake strikes Kalamata, Greece with a maximum Modified Mercalli intensity of X (Extreme), killing at least 20 and causing heavy damage in the city.
1987 – Goiânia accident: A radioactive object is stolen from an abandoned hospital in Goiânia, Brazil, contaminating many people in the following weeks and causing some to die from radiation poisoning.
1988 – Hurricane Gilbert is the strongest recorded hurricane in the Western Hemisphere, later replaced by Hurricane Wilma in 2005 (based on barometric pressure).
1989 – Largest anti-Apartheid march in South Africa, led by Desmond Tutu.
1993 – Israeli Prime Minister Yitzhak Rabin shakes hands with Palestine Liberation Organization chairman Yasser Arafat at the White House after signing the Oslo Accords granting limited Palestinian autonomy.
1997 – A German Air Force Tupolev Tu-154 and a United States Air Force Lockheed C-141 Starlifter collide in mid-air near Namibia, killing 33.
2001 – Civilian aircraft traffic resumes in the United States after the September 11 attacks.
2007 – The Declaration on the Rights of Indigenous Peoples is adopted by the United Nations General Assembly.
  2007   – The McLaren F1 team are found guilty of possessing confidential information from the Ferrari team, fined $100 million, and excluded from the constructors' championship standings.
2008 – Delhi, India, is hit by a series of bomb blasts, resulting in 30 deaths and 130 injuries.
  2008   – Hurricane Ike makes landfall on the Texas Gulf Coast of the United States, causing heavy damage to Galveston Island, Houston, and surrounding areas.
2013 – Taliban insurgents attack the United States consulate in Herat, Afghanistan, with two members of the Afghan National Police reported dead and about 20 civilians injured.
2018 – The Merrimack Valley gas explosions: One person is killed, 25 are injured, and 40 homes are destroyed when excessive natural gas pressure caused fires and explosions.

Births

Pre-1600
AD 64 – Julia Flavia, Roman daughter of Titus (d. AD 91)
 678 – K'inich Ahkal Mo' Nahb III, Mayan ruler (d. 730)
1087 – John II Komnenos, Byzantine emperor (d. 1143)
1373 – Minkhaung I, King of Ava (d. 1431)
1475 – Cesare Borgia, Italian cardinal (d. 1507)
1502 – John Leland, English poet and historian (d. 1552)
1521 – William Cecil, 1st Baron Burghley, English academic and politician, Lord High Treasurer (d. 1598)
1594 – Francesco Manelli, Italian theorbo player and composer (d. 1667)

1601–1900
1604 – Sir William Brereton, 1st Baronet, English commander and politician (d. 1698)
1755 – Oliver Evans, American inventor, engineer and businessman (d. 1819)
1802 – Arnold Ruge, German philosopher and author (d. 1880)
1813 – John Sedgwick, American general and educator (d. 1864)
1818 – Lucy Goode Brooks, Former American slave and a founder of Friends' Asylum for Colored Orphans (d. 1900)
1819 – Clara Schumann, German pianist and composer (d. 1896)
1830 – Marie von Ebner-Eschenbach, Austrian author (d. 1916)
1842 – John H. Bankhead, American soldier and politician (d. 1920)
1851 – Walter Reed, American physician and biologist (d. 1902)
1857 – Michał Drzymała, Polish rebel and activist (d. 1937)
  1857   – Milton S. Hershey, American businessman, founded The Hershey Company (d. 1945)
1860 – John J. Pershing, American general and lawyer (d. 1948)
1865 – William Birdwood, Indian-English field marshal (d. 1951)
1872 – Kijūrō Shidehara, Japanese politician and diplomat, 44th Prime Minister of Japan (d. 1951)
1873 – Constantin Carathéodory, German mathematician and author (d. 1950)
1874 – Henry F. Ashurst, American lawyer and politician (d. 1962)
  1874   – Arnold Schoenberg, Austrian composer and painter (d. 1951)
1876 – Sherwood Anderson,  American novelist and short story writer (d. 1941)
1877 – Wilhelm Filchner, German-Swiss explorer (d. 1957)
  1877   – Stanley Lord, English captain (d. 1962)
1880 – Jesse L. Lasky, American film producer, co-founded Famous Players-Lasky (d. 1958)
1882 – Ramón Grau, Cuban physician and politician, 6th President of Cuba (d. 1969)
1883 – LeRoy Samse, American pole vaulter (d. 1956)
  1883   – Petros Voulgaris, Greek admiral and politician, 136th Prime Minister of Greece (d. 1957)
1885 – Wilhelm Blaschke, Austrian-German mathematician and academic (d. 1962)
1886 – Amelie Beese, German pilot and sculptor (d. 1925)
  1886   – Robert Robinson, English chemist and academic, Nobel Prize laureate (d. 1975)
1887 – Leopold Ružička, Croatian-Swiss biochemist and academic, Nobel Prize laureate (d. 1976)
1890 – Antony Noghès, French-Monegasque businessman, founded the Monaco Grand Prix (d. 1978)
1891 – Max Pruss, German captain and pilot (d. 1960)
1893 – Larry Shields, American clarinet player (d. 1953)
1894 – J. B. Priestley, English novelist and playwright (d. 1984)
  1894   – Julian Tuwim, Polish poet, playwright, and director (d. 1953)
1895 – Morris Kirksey, American rugby player and sprinter (d. 1981)
1898 – Roger Désormière, French conductor and composer (d. 1963)
  1898   – C. Sittampalam, Sri Lankan lawyer and politician (d. 1964)
1899 – Corneliu Zelea Codreanu, Romanian politician (d. 1938)

1901–present
1903 – Claudette Colbert, American actress (d. 1996)
  1904   – Alberta Williams King, American civil rights organizer, mother of Martin Luther King, Jr. (d. 1974)
1904 – Gladys George, American actress (d. 1954)
1908 – Chu Berry, American saxophonist (d. 1941)
  1908   – Karolos Koun, Greek director and playwright (d. 1987)
  1908   – Sicco Mansholt, Dutch farmer and politician, 4th President of the European Commission (d. 1995)
  1908   – Mae Questel, American actress and vocal artist (d. 1998)
1909 – Ray Bowden, English footballer (d. 1998)
  1909   – Frits Thors, Dutch journalist and radio host (d. 2014)
1911 – Bill Monroe, American singer-songwriter and mandolin player (d. 1996)
1912 – Maurice K. Goddard, American colonel and politician (d. 1995)
  1912   – Reta Shaw, American actress (d. 1982)
1914 – Leonard Feather, English-American pianist, composer, producer, and journalist (d. 1994)
1916 – Roald Dahl, British novelist, poet, and screenwriter (d. 1990)
1917 – Carol Kendall, American historian and author (d. 2012)
  1917   – Robert Ward, American soldier, composer, and educator (d. 2013)
1918 – Ray Charles, American singer-songwriter and conductor (d. 2015)
  1918   – Dick Haymes, Argentinian actor and singer (d. 1980)
1919 – Mary Midgley, English philosopher and author (d. 2018)
  1919   – George Weidenfeld, Baron Weidenfeld, Austrian-English journalist, publisher, and philanthropist (d. 2016)
1920 – Else Holmelund Minarik, Danish-American journalist and author (d. 2012)
1922 – Charles Brown, American singer and pianist (d. 1999)
  1922   – Caroline Duby Glassman, American lawyer and jurist (d. 2013)
1923 – Édouard Boubat, French photographer and journalist (d. 1999)
1924 – Harold Blair, Australian tenor and educator (d. 1976)
  1924   – Scott Brady, American actor (d. 1985)
  1924   – Maurice Jarre, French composer and conductor (d. 2009)
1925 – Mel Tormé, American singer-songwriter and actor (d. 1999)
1926 – Andrew Brimmer, American economist and academic (d. 2012)
  1926   – Emile Francis, Canadian ice hockey player, coach, and manager (d. 2022)
  1926   – J. Frank Raley Jr., American soldier and politician (d. 2012)
1927 – Laura Cardoso, Brazilian actress
1928 – Robert Indiana, American painter and sculptor (d. 2018)
  1928   – Tzannis Tzannetakis, Greek soldier and politician, 175th Prime Minister of Greece (d. 2010)
1930 – Robert Gavron, Baron Gavron, English publisher and philanthropist (d. 2015)
1931 – Barbara Bain, American actress
  1931   – Robert Bédard, Canadian tennis player and sportscaster
  1931   – Marjorie Jackson-Nelson, Australian sprinter and politician, 33rd Governor of South Australia
  1931   – Rein Maran, Estonian cinematographer
  1931   – Lauretta Ngcobo, South African novelist and essayist (d. 2015)
1932 – Fernando González Pacheco, Spanish-Colombian journalist and actor (d. 2014)
  1932   – Radoslav Brzobohatý, Czech actor (d. 2012)
  1932   – Bengt Hallberg, Swedish pianist and composer (d. 2013)
1933 – Eileen Fulton, American actress
  1933   – Donald Mackay, Australian businessman and activist (d. 1977)
  1933   – Lewie Steinberg, American bass player (d. 2016)
1934 – Tony Pickard, English tennis player and coach
1936 – Stefano Delle Chiaie, Italian activist, founded National Vanguard (d. 2019)
1937 – Don Bluth, American animator, director, and producer, co-founded Sullivan Bluth Studios and Fox Animation Studios
1938 – John Smith, Scottish lawyer and politician, Shadow Chancellor of the Exchequer (d. 1994)
1939 – Arleen Auger, American soprano and educator (d. 1993)
  1939   – Richard Kiel, American actor and voice artist (d. 2014)
  1939   – Guntis Ulmanis, Latvian economist and politician, 5th President of Latvia
  1939   – Joel-Peter Witkin, American photographer
1940 – Óscar Arias, Costa Rican politician, President of Costa Rica, Nobel Prize laureate
  1940   – Kerry Stokes, Australian businessman
1941 – Tadao Ando, Japanese architect and academic, designed Piccadilly Gardens
  1941   – David Clayton-Thomas, English-Canadian singer-songwriter and guitarist 
  1941   – Ahmet Necdet Sezer, Turkish judge and politician, 10th President of the Republic of Turkey
1942 – Michel Côté, Canadian businessman and politician
1943 – Mildred D. Taylor, American author
1944 – Carol Barnes, English journalist (d. 2008)
  1944   – Jacqueline Bisset, English actress and producer
  1944   – Peter Cetera, American singer-songwriter, bass player, and producer 
  1944   – Midget Farrelly, Australian surfer (d. 2016)
1945 – Noël Godin, Belgian actor, director, and screenwriter
  1945   – Andres Küng, Swedish journalist and politician (d. 2002)
1946 – Frank Marshall, American director and producer
  1946   – Henri Kuprashvili, Georgian swimmer
1948 – Nell Carter, American actress and singer (d. 2003)
  1948   – Dimitri Nanopoulos, Greek physicist and academic
  1948   – Sitiveni Rabuka, Fijian general and politician, 3rd Prime Minister of Fiji
1949 – John W. Henry, American businessman 
1950 – Włodzimierz Cimoszewicz, Polish lawyer and politician, 8th Prime Minister of Poland
  1950   – Pat Holland, English footballer and manager
  1950   – Jeff Lowe, American mountaineer (d. 2018)
1951 – Anne Devlin, Irish author, playwright, and screenwriter
  1951   – Salva Kiir Mayardit, South Sudanese politician, 1st President of South Sudan 
  1951   – Jean Smart, American actress 
1952 – Réjean Giroux, Canadian ice hockey player
  1952   – Randy Jones, American pop and disco singer
  1952   – Don Was, American bass player and producer 
1954 – Steve Kilbey, English-Australian singer-songwriter and bass player 
1955 – Colin Moynihan, 4th Baron Moynihan, English rower and politician, Minister for Sport and the Olympics
  1955   – Joe Morris, American guitarist and composer
1956 – Alain Ducasse, French-Monégasque chef
  1956   – Anne Geddes, Australian-New Zealand photographer and fashion designer
  1956   – Martin Hurson, Irish Republican, hunger striker (d. 1981)
  1956   – Joni Sledge, American singer and songwriter (d. 2017)
1957 – Vinny Appice, American rock drummer
  1957   – Judy Blumberg, American ice dancer and sportscaster
  1957   – Mal Donaghy, Irish footballer and manager
  1957   – Brad Hooker, English-American philosopher and academic
  1957   – Eleanor King, English lawyer and judge
  1957   – John G. Trueschler, American lawyer and politician
  1957   – Mark Wiebe, American golfer
  1957   – Keith Black, American neurosurgeon and academic
  1957   – Bongbong Marcos, 17th President of the Philippines
1958 – Bobby Davro, English comedian and actor
  1958   – Paweł Przytocki, Polish conductor and academic
  1958   – Kōji Tamaki, Japanese singer-songwriter and actor 
1959 – Tatyana Mitkova, Russian journalist
1960 – Kevin Carter, South African photojournalist (d. 1994) 
1961 – Dave Mustaine, American singer-songwriter, guitarist, and producer 
  1961   – KK Null, Japanese singer-songwriter and guitarist 
  1961   – Peter Roskam, American lawyer and politician
1962 – Neal Lancaster, American golfer
  1962   – Tõnu Õnnepalu, Estonian author 
1963 – Yuri Alexandrov, Russian boxer (d. 2013)
  1963   – Antony Galione, Professor of Pharmacology at the University of Oxford
  1963   – Theodoros Roussopoulos, Greek journalist and politician
  1963   – Robin Smith, South African-English cricketer
1964 – Tavis Smiley, American talk show host, journalist, and author
1965 – Annie Duke, American poker player and author
  1965   – Jeff Ross, American comedian, director, and author
  1965   – Zak Starkey, English drummer 
1966 – Maria Furtwängler, German physician and actress
  1966   – Brendan Hall, Australian rugby league player
1967 – Michael Johnson, American former sprinter and journalist
  1967   – Tim "Ripper" Owens, American singer-songwriter and guitarist 
  1967   – Stephen Perkins, American drummer and songwriter 
1968 – Brad Johnson, American football player
  1968   – Bernie Williams, Puerto Rican-American baseball player and guitarist
1969 – Daniel Fonseca, Uruguayan footballer
  1969   – Tyler Perry, American actor, director, producer, and screenwriter
  1969   – Shane Warne, Australian cricketer, coach, and sportscaster (d. 2022)
1970 – Lee Abramson, American bass player and composer (d. 2016)
  1970   – Martín Herrera, Argentinian footballer
  1970   – Louise Lombard, English actress
1971 – Ben Alexander, Australian rugby league player (d. 1992)
  1971   – Goran Ivanišević, Croatian tennis player and coach
  1971   – Stella McCartney, English fashion designer
  1971   – Manabu Namiki, Japanese pianist and composer
1973 – Christine Arron, French runner
  1973   – Fabio Cannavaro, Italian footballer and manager
  1973   – Carlo Nash, English footballer and photographer
1974 – Travis Knight, American basketball player
  1974   – Éric Lapointe, Canadian football player
  1974   – Craig Rivet, Canadian ice hockey player
1975 – Akihiro Asai, Japanese race car driver
  1975   – Joe Don Rooney, American singer-songwriter and guitarist 
  1975   – Idan Tal, Israeli footballer
1976 – Ro Khanna, American politician
  1976   – Craig McMillan, New Zealand cricketer, coach, and sportscaster
  1976   – Elvis Mihailenko, Latvian boxer, trainer, and sportscaster
  1976   – José Théodore, Canadian ice hockey player and sportscaster
  1976   – Puma Swede, Swedish pornographic actress
1977 – Fiona Apple, American singer-songwriter, producer, and pianist 
  1977   – Ivan De Battista, Maltese actor, singer, director, and producer
  1977   – Daisuke Tsuda, Japanese singer-songwriter and drummer 
1978 – Swizz Beatz, American rapper and producer
  1978   – Peter Sunde, Swedish businessman
  1978   – Masato Shibata, Japanese wrestler
1979 – Geike Arnaert, Belgian singer 
  1979   – Tony Henry, English footballer
1980 – Andreas Biermann, German footballer (d. 2014)
  1980   – Han Chae-young, South Korean actress
  1980   – Daisuke Matsuzaka, Japanese baseball player
  1980   – Evangelos Nastos, Greek footballer
  1980   – Viren Rasquinha, Indian field hockey player
1981 – Koldo Fernández, Spanish cyclist
  1981   – Angelina Love, Canadian-American wrestler
1982 – Lloyd Dyer, English footballer
  1982   – Nenê, Brazilian basketball player
  1982   – Rickie Weeks, American baseball player
  1982   – Colin Marston, American guitarist, bassist, and producer/engineer
  1982   – Miha Zupan, Slovenian basketball player
1983 – James Bourne, English singer-songwriter, guitarist, and producer 
  1983   – Molly Crabapple, American illustrator and journalist
  1983   – Ryan Del Monte, Canadian ice hockey player
  1983   – Eduard Ratnikov, Estonian footballer
1984 – Nabil Abou-Harb, American director, producer, and screenwriter
  1984   – Baron Corbin, American wrestler
1985 – David Jordan, English singer-songwriter
  1985   – Tom Learoyd-Lahrs, Australian rugby league player
1986 – Steve Colpaert, Belgian footballer
  1986   – Derek Hardman, American football player
  1986   – Kamui Kobayashi, Japanese race car driver
  1986   – Sean Williams, American basketball player
1987 – Edenilson Bergonsi, Brazilian footballer
  1987   – Jonathan de Guzmán, Canadian-Dutch footballer
  1987   – Luke Fitzgerald, Irish rugby player
  1987   – Tsvetana Pironkova, Bulgarian tennis player
1988 – Luis Rentería, Panamanian footballer (d. 2014)
  1988   – Keith Treacy, Irish footballer
1989 – Elysée Irié Bi Séhi, Ivorian footballer
  1989   – Kenny Edwards, New Zealand rugby league player
  1989   – Jon Mannah, Australian rugby league player (d. 2013)
  1989   – Thomas Müller, German footballer
  1989   – William Owusu, Ghanaian footballer
1990 – Aoi Nakabeppu, Japanese model and actress
  1990   – Luciano Narsingh, Dutch footballer
1991 – Ksenia Afanasyeva, Russian gymnast
1993 – Niall Horan, Irish singer
  1993   – Alice Merton, Irish-Canadian singer and songwriter
1994 – Anna Karolína Schmiedlová, Slovak tennis player
1994     – Leonor Andrade, Portuguese singer
  1994   – Cameron Munster, Australian rugby league player
1995 – Jerry Tollbring, Swedish handball player
  1995   – João Carlos Almeida Leandro, Portuguese footballer
1996 – Playboi Carti, American rapper

Deaths

Pre-1600
81 – Titus, Roman emperor (b. AD 39)
413 – Marcellinus of Carthage, martyr and saint
531 – Kavad I, Sasanian King of Kings of Iran (b. 473)
864 – Pietro Tradonico, doge of Venice
908 – Cormac mac Cuilennáin, king of Munster (Ireland)
1171 – Al-Adid, last Fatimid caliph (b. 1151)
1313 – Notburga, Austrian saint (b. 1265)
1409 – Isabella of Valois, queen consort of England (b. 1389)
1488 – Charles II, Duke of Bourbon (b. 1434)
1506 – Andrea Mantegna, Italian painter and engraver (b. 1431)
1557 – John Cheke, English scholar and politician, Secretary of State for England (b. 1514)
1592 – Michel de Montaigne, French philosopher and author (b. 1533)
1598 – Philip II of Spain (b. 1526)

1601–1900
1612 – Karin Månsdotter, Queen of Sweden (b. 1550)
1632 – Leopold V, Archduke of Austria (b. 1586)
1759 – James Wolfe, English general (b. 1727)
1766 – Benjamin Heath, English scholar and author (b. 1704)
1800 – Claude Martin, French-English general and explorer (b. 1735)
1806 – Charles James Fox, English soldier and politician, Secretary of State for Foreign and Commonwealth Affairs (b. 1749)
1808 – Saverio Bettinelli, Italian poet, playwright, and critic (b. 1718)
1813 – Hezqeyas, Ethiopian emperor
1847 – Nicolas Oudinot, French general (b. 1767)
1871 – İbrahim Şinasi, Turkish journalist, author, and translator (b. 1826)
1872 – Ludwig Feuerbach, German anthropologist and philosopher (b. 1804)
1881 – Ambrose Burnside, American general and politician, 30th Governor of Rhode Island (b. 1824)
1885 – Friedrich Kiel, German composer and educator (b. 1821)
1894 – Emmanuel Chabrier, French pianist and composer (b. 1841)

1901–present
1905 – René Goblet, French lawyer and politician, 52nd Prime Minister of France (b. 1828)
1910 – Rajanikanta Sen, Bangladeshi poet and composer (b. 1865)
1912 – Joseph Furphy, Australian author and poet (b. 1843)
  1912   – Nogi Maresuke, Japanese general (b. 1849)
1913 – Aurel Vlaicu, Romanian pilot and engineer (b. 1882)
1915 – Andrew L. Harris, American general and politician, 44th Governor of Ohio (b. 1835)
1918 – Frederic Crowninshield, American artist and author (b. 1845)
1928 – Italo Svevo, Italian author and playwright (b. 1861)
1929 – Jatindra Nath Das, Indian activist (b. 1904)
1931 – Lili Elbe, Danish model and painter (b. 1882)
1937 – David Robertson, Scottish rugby player and golfer (b. 1869)
1941 – Elias Disney, Canadian-American farmer and businessman (b. 1859)
1944 – W. Heath Robinson, English cartoonist (b. 1872)
1946 – Amon Göth, Austrian captain and Nazi war criminal (b. 1908)
  1946   – Eugene Lanceray, Russian painter, sculptor, and illustrator (b. 1875)
  1946   – William Watt, Australian lawyer and politician, 24th Premier of Victoria (b. 1871)
1949 – August Krogh, Danish physiologist and academic, Nobel Prize laureate (b. 1874)
1953 – Mary Brewster Hazelton, American painter (b. 1868)
1960 – Leó Weiner, Hungarian composer and educator (b. 1885)
1967 – Mohammed bin Awad bin Laden, Yemeni-Saudi Arabian businessman, founded Saudi Binladin Group (b. 1903)
  1967   – Robert George, English air marshal and politician, 24th Governor of South Australia (b. 1896)
  1967   – Leonard Lord, English businessman (b. 1896)
1971 – Lin Biao, Chinese general and politician, 2nd Vice Premier of the People's Republic of China (b. 1907)
1973 – Betty Field, American actress (b. 1913)
  1973   – Sajjad Zaheer, Indian poet and philosopher (b. 1905)
1975 – Mudicondan Venkatarama Iyer, Indian singer and musicologist (b. 1897)
1976 – Armand Mondou, Canadian ice hockey player (b. 1905)
  1976   – Albert Tessier, Canadian priest, historian, and director (b. 1895)
1977 – Leopold Stokowski, English conductor (b. 1882)
1982 – Reed Crandall, American illustrator (b. 1917)
1985 – Dane Rudhyar, French-American astrologer, composer, and author (b. 1895)
1987 – Mervyn LeRoy, American actor, director, and producer (b. 1900)
1991 – Robert Irving, English soldier and conductor (b. 1913)
  1991   – Metin Oktay, Turkish footballer and manager (b. 1936)
  1991   – Joe Pasternak, Hungarian-American production manager and producer (b. 1901)
1993 – Carl Voss, American ice hockey player and referee (b. 1907)
1996 – Tupac Shakur, American rapper, producer, and actor (b. 1971)
1997 – Georges Guétary, Egyptian-French actor, singer, and dancer (b. 1915)
  1997   – Georgios Mitsibonas, Greek footballer (b. 1962)
1998 – Necdet Calp, Turkish civil servant and politician (b. 1922)
  1998   – Harry Lumley, Canadian ice hockey player (b. 1926)
  1998   – Frank Renouf, New Zealand businessman (b. 1918)
  1998   – George Wallace, American sergeant, lawyer, and politician, 45th Governor of Alabama (b. 1919)
1999 – Benjamin Bloom, American psychologist and academic (b. 1913)
2000 – Betty Jeffrey, Australian nurse and author (b. 1908)
2001 – Johnny Craig, American sailor and illustrator (b. 1926)
  2001   – Jaroslav Drobný, Czech-English ice hockey player and tennis player (b. 1921)
  2001   – Dorothy McGuire, American actress (b. 1916)
2002 – George Stanley, Canadian soldier, historian, and author, designed the Flag of Canada (b. 1907)
2003 – Frank O'Bannon, American publisher, lawyer, and politician, 47th Governor of Indiana (b. 1930)
2004 – Luis E. Miramontes, Mexican chemist, co-invented the birth-control pill (b. 1925)
2005 – Toni Fritsch, Austrian footballer (b. 1945)
  2005   – Julio César Turbay Ayala, Colombian lawyer and politician, 25th President of Colombia (b. 1916)
2006 – Ann Richards, American educator and politician, 45th Governor of Texas (b. 1933)
2007 – Whakahuihui Vercoe, New Zealand archbishop (b. 1928)
2009 – Paul Burke, American actor (b. 1926)
2011 – Walter Bonatti, Italian mountaineer and journalist (b. 1930)
2012 – William Duckworth, American composer and author (b. 1943)
  2012   – Peter Lougheed, Canadian football player, lawyer, and politician, 10th Premier of Alberta (b. 1928)
  2012   – Edgar Metcalfe, English-Australian actor and director (b. 1933)
  2012   – Ranganath Misra, Indian lawyer and jurist, 21st Chief Justice of India (b. 1926)
2013 – Olusegun Agagu, Nigerian politician, 15th Governor of Ondo State (b. 1948)
  2013   – Robert J. Behnke, American biologist and academic (b. 1929)
  2013   – Rick Casares, American football player (b. 1931)
  2013   – Luiz Gushiken, Brazilian trade union leader and politician (b. 1950)
2014 – Benjamin Adekunle, Nigerian general (b. 1936)
  2014   – Helen Filarski, American baseball player (b. 1924)
  2014   – Milan Galić, Serbian footballer (b. 1938)
  2014   – Frank Torre, American baseball player and manager (b. 1931)
2015 – Vivinho, Brazilian footballer (b. 1961)
  2015   – Erma Bergmann, American baseball player (b. 1924)
  2015   – Brian Close, English cricketer and coach (b. 1931)
  2015   – Moses Malone, American basketball player and sportscaster (b. 1955)
2016 – Jonathan Riley-Smith, British historian (b. 1938)
2017 – Pete Domenici, American politician, senator of New Mexico (b. 1932)
2019 – Eddie Money, American musician (b. 1949)
2022 – Jean-Luc Godard, French-Swiss film director, screenwriter, and film critic (b. 1930)

Holidays and observances
 Christian feast day:
Feast of the Cross (Assyrian Church of the East)
 Aimé (Amatus)
 Ame
 Eulogius of Alexandria
 John Chrysostom
 Marcellinus of Carthage
 Maurilius (Maurille) of Angers
 Nectarius of Autun
 Venerius the Hermit
 Wulfthryth (Wilfrida) of Wilton
 September 13 (Eastern Orthodox liturgics)
 Day of the Programmer, during a non-leap year. (International)
 Día de los Niños Héroes (Mexico)
 Engineer's Day (Mauritius) 
 Roald Dahl Day (Africa, United Kingdom, Latin America)

References

External links

 
 
 

Days of the year
September